The Menier family of Noisiel, France, was a prominent family of chocolatiers who began as pharmaceutical manufacturers in Paris in 1816. They would build a highly successful enterprise, expanding to London, and New York City. The Menier Chocolate Co. remained in the family until 1965. Today, it is owned by the Nestlé company.

The family owned several significant estates in Noisiel, Houlgate, Cannes, and Vauréal as well as the famous Château de Chenonceau in the Loire Valley.

 Antoine Brutus Menier (1795–1853)
 Emile-Justin Menier (1826–1881)
 Henri Menier (1853–1913)
 Gaston Menier (1855–1934)
 Hubert Menier (1910–1959)
 Antoine Gilles Menier (1904–1967)

 
Chocolatiers